The Sheridan Hawks are a USA Hockey-sanctioned Tier III junior ice hockey team in the North American 3 Hockey League (NA3HL). The team plays home games at the Sheridan Ice M&M’s Center in Sheridan, Wyoming.

History 

The team previously played at The River's Edge Ice Arena in Davenport, Iowa, where it was known as the Quad City Express and the Quad City Jr. Flames. In May 2013, the team announced that the Quad City Jr. Flames were granted approval by the NA3HL Board of Governors and the USA Hockey Junior Council to relocate to Madison, Wisconsin, for the 2013–14 season and play out of Hartmeyer Ice Arena as the Wisconsin Whalers. The team began playing out of the Oregon Ice Arena in nearby Oregon, Wisconsin, in the 2015–16 season.

Following the 2018–19 season, the Whalers were sold to the Sheridan Hawks Junior Hockey Club, an ownership group consisting of Dr. Brenton Milner, Dan Carlin, Sandy Suzor, Charles Whiton, and Dave Nelson based in Sheridan, Wyoming. The team was then branded as the Sheridan Hawks.

The players, ages 16–20, carried amateur status under Junior A guidelines and would hope to earn a spot on higher levels of junior ice hockey in the United States and Canada, collegiate, and eventually professional teams.

Season-by-season records

References

External links
 Official website
 NA3HL Website

Ice hockey teams in Wisconsin
Ice hockey clubs established in 2013
2013 establishments in Wisconsin
Dane County, Wisconsin